Qallu is one of the thirteen sub-clans of the Sheikhal clan. Sheikhal are of Arab origin and brought Islam to Ethiopia and Somalia. The Sheekhaal inhabit Somali region, Somalia and Djibouti.

Etymology

Qallu is a common name known in Oromo and Somali traditions because there is a clan called “Qallu’’ within each of these ethnic groups.  However, it is the Somalis who enthusiastically refer to the name.
It is said that “Qallu”  is referring to "people of the religion"  and it describes the Qallu’s main occupation in their societies.  That means in the past, most of the persons who belong to Qallu clan were dominantly the teachers of Islam in the areas that they reside.

Variations in the Descriptions of Qallu

The Qallu inhabit Hararghe, Somali Region, and Dire Dawa as well as the Republics of Somalia and Djibouti. The Qallu in Ethiopia trace back their genealogy to Abadir Umar Al Rida the immediate ancestor of the Sheekhaal Clan.

Geographical Dispersions of the Qallu

Richard Burton describes that Qallu (Sheekhaash) is dispersed among its brothers (other clans) and they can be found from Ifat up to Ogaden. This is an exact description of the highly reverend clan of Qallu. Today, as Burton witnessed 150 years ago the Qallu inhabit a vast area. However, the highly concentrated communities of the Qallu can be found in the following areas.

 in Babille, Deder, Jarso and Gursum in East Hararghe;
 in the Walled City of Harar;
 in Shinile Zone Somali Region;
 in Dire Dawa chartered city;
 in  Jijiga woreda of the Somali Region;
 in Habro, Gubba Qoricha, Qunni, Chiro, Boke and Mieso woredas of West Hararghe,  Zone.

See also 

 Sheekhaal
 Siddiqis in the Horn of Africa
 Abu Bakr
 Shaikh
 Siddiqui
 Shaikhs in South Asia

References 

Muslim communities in Africa
Oromo groups
Ethnic groups in Somalia
Ethnic groups in Djibouti
Islamic culture
Surnames